Abdullatif Al-Mahmood (born 1946 in Hidd) is a Bahraini politician and doctor. He is of Sunni Arab origins.

Activism 
In 1992, he signed on the uprising petition which had been demanding the return of Bahraini parliament deputy causing him to be detained for two weeks. Following his release, he withdrew from arguing that the petition had taken other goals. Afterwards, he disappeared from the political scene and worked as a doctor at the University of Bahrain.

Return to politics 
During the Bahraini protests that began on 2011, Abdullatif Al-Mahmood appeared as president of the pro-government Gathering of National Unity, led the Fateh Mosque assembly, and coordinated the Sunnis demands.

See also 
 Al Fateh Grand Mosque
 Adnan Al-Qattan

References 

1946 births
Living people
Bahraini politicians
Bahraini Sunni Muslims